Boitsfort railway station is a railway station located in the municipality of Watermael-Boitsfort in Brussels, Belgium and operated by the SNCB/NMBS. It is on the line 161  connecting Brussels and Namur, between the stations of Watermael and Groenendaal. The Boitsfort railway station can be accessed via the Chaussée de La Hulpe/Terhulpsesteenweg next to the Sonian Forest and the Boitsfort Hippodrome. Many companies have offices nearby the station, for instance Emakina, Asahi Glass Co. and SAP AG.

Train services
The station is served by the following service(s):

Brussels RER services (S8) Brussels - Etterbeek - Ottignies - Louvain-le-Neuve
Brussels RER services (S81) Schaarbeek - Brussels-Luxembourg - Etterbeek - Ottignies (weekdays, peak hours only)

References

Railway stations in Brussels
Watermael-Boitsfort
Railway stations opened in 1854